Redoubtia polypodia is a fossil from the Burgess Shale that was originally described (and later refigured) by Charles Walcott as a holothurian echinoderm.  Its affinity is unclear, though; it has also been compared to lobopodians.

References

Burgess Shale animals
Fossil taxa described in 1918